Dundalk entered the 2014 season having finished as runners-up in 2013. 2014 was Stephen Kenny's second season at the club as manager. It was Dundalk's sixth consecutive season in the top tier of Irish football, their 79th in all, and their 88th in the League of Ireland.

Season summary
Before the League programme got underway, Dundalk were defeated by St Patrick's Athletic in the fourth round of the Leinster Senior Cup. The 33 round League programme commenced on 7 March 2014, and they were surprisingly beaten 4–1 away to Drogheda United on the opening night. But they quickly reached the top of the table and, as the season progressed, and with defending champions St Patrick's Athletic falling away, Dundalk and Cork City were left to compete for the title. On the final night of the season, Dundalk defeated Cork 2–0 in Oriel Park to win the title – their tenth, and first since 1994–95.

In the remaining cup competitions, they reached the final of the 2014 Setanta Sports Cup – losing to Sligo Rovers 1–0 in a rain-drenched match. They won the 2014 League of Ireland Cup Final with a 3–2 victory over Shamrock Rovers in Oriel Park, thereby winning the club's first League and League Cup double. The League Cup win came five days after Rovers had defeated Dundalk in the 2014 FAI Cup quarter-final, which had gone to a replay.

In Europe they were knocked out at the second hurdle, losing to Hajduk Split in the Europa League second qualifying round. Having comfortably defeated Jeunesse Esch 5–1 on aggregate in the first qualifying round, they lost the first leg of the second qualifying round 2–0 in Oriel. But they recovered from going a goal down in Split to take a 2–1 lead, just falling short of the third away goal that would have won the tie.

First-Team Squad (2014)
Sources:

Competitions

Premier Division
Source:

League table

FAI Cup
Source:
Second Round

Third Round

Quarter Final

Quarter Final Replay

League Cup
Source:
Second Round

Quarter Final

Semi Final

Final

Setanta Cup
Source:
Quarter Final First Leg

Quarter Final Second Leg

Dundalk won 4–3 on aggregate.

Semi Final First Leg

Semi Final Second Leg

Dundalk won 3–1 on aggregate.

Final

Leinster Senior Cup
Source:
Fourth Round

Europe

Europa League
Source:
First qualifying round

Dundalk won 5–1 on aggregate.
Second qualifying round

Hajduk Split won 3–2 on aggregate.

Awards

Player of the Month

SWAI Personality of the Year

References

Dundalk F.C. seasons
Dundalk